Qoroq (also known as Qoroq-e ‘Olyā and Qoroq-e Bālā) is a village in Qoroq Rural District, Baharan District, Gorgan County, Golestan Province, Iran. At the 2006 census, its population was 6,651, in 1,674 families.

References 

Populated places in Gorgan County